Lawrence Aloysius Burke  (27 October 1932  – 24 January 2010) was the 4th Roman Catholic Archbishop of the Roman Catholic Archdiocese of Kingston in Jamaica. He also served previously as the 1st Archbishop of the newly created Roman Catholic Archdiocese of Nassau beginning in 1999.

Born in Kingston, Jamaica, he was ordained as a Jesuit priest on 16 June 1968. Burke was appointed Bishop of what is now the Roman Catholic Archdiocese of Nassau, Bahamas on 17 July 1981 (the first born in the Caribbean), and was consecrated 11 October 1981. In June 1999, Pope John Paul II named Bishop Burke Archbishop of the Archdiocese of Nassau.

On 17 February 2004, Pope John Paul II appointed Archbishop Burke Archbishop of the Roman Catholic Archdiocese of Kingston in Jamaica. Archbishop Burke retired on 12 April 2008.

Archbishop Burke obtained a BA in philosophy from Boston College (1957), an MA in philosophy from Boston College (1958), an PhL (Licentiate in Philosophy) from Weston College (1958), an MA in theology from Boston College (1965), an STL (Licentiate in Sacred Theology) from Weston College (1965), and a MALS from Wesleyan University (1970).

He died of cancer in Kingston, aged 77.

References

1932 births
2010 deaths
People from Kingston, Jamaica
Morrissey College of Arts & Sciences alumni
Wesleyan University alumni
Jamaican Roman Catholic archbishops
Roman Catholic bishops in the Bahamas
Jamaican Jesuits
Jesuit archbishops
People from Nassau, Bahamas
Deaths from cancer in Jamaica
Members of the Order of Jamaica
Roman Catholic archbishops of Kingston in Jamaica
20th-century Roman Catholic bishops in the Caribbean
Roman Catholic archbishops of Nassau
Roman Catholic bishops of Nassau